The Autonomous Province of Western Bosnia, or Western Bosnia, was a small unrecognised state that existed in the northwest of Bosnia and Herzegovina between 1993 and 1995. It consisted of the town of Velika Kladuša, its capital, as well as a few nearby villages. It was proclaimed as a result of secessionist politics by Fikret Abdić against the central government of Alija Izetbegović during the Bosnian War. For a short time in 1995, it was known as the Republic of Western Bosnia.

History 

Fikret Abdić was the winner of the popular vote to head the government of Bosnia in 1990 but surrendered to Alija Izetbegović under an undisclosed agreement.

In 1993, according to journalist Anthony Loyd, Abdić decided to try to carve out a little state for himself and succeeded in recruiting enough followers to make his dreams a reality. Abdić was able to hold power over his mini-state by using cult-like propaganda techniques over his followers and Serbian arms and military training. "Talking to his autonomist followers was much the same as speaking with cult converts anywhere in the world: a wooden dead-end dialogue hallmarked by the absence of individual rationale and logic." Local residents of Velika Kladuša were reported as treating Abdić with excessive reverence and "were ready to do whatever he said."

The economy of Western Bosnia was largely reliant on the Agrokomerc company of Velika Kladuša. 

Little is known about Western Bosnia's political system excluding Abdić and most officeholders have faded into obscurity. A 2010 document pertaining to the final judgment of the Zlatko Jušić (Prime Minister of the APZB) and Ibrahim Jušić (Head of the APZB Police and Security Service) trial held in Croatia, cited the opinion of one witness that the Government of the APZB was "a farce, an ornament" and that it was not consulted with as Abdić himself made decisions regarding key issues. This statement was one of the reasons behind Zlatko Jušić's subsequent aquittal of all war crimes charges. AP Western Bosnia also featured a Constituent Assembly, the Vice President of which was Bozidar Sicel.

The Autonomous Province cooperated with Serbia as well as Croatia against the Bosnian government. Abdić's role in undermining the rival authority in Sarajevo was awarded by the governments of Croatia and FR Yugoslavia (Serbia). Agrokomerc was granted a custom-free trade zone in the Croatian port of Rijeka and free trade with Serbian-controlled territories. Trade between Western Bosnia and Croatia occurred during the Bosnian War.

In 1994, Franjo Tuđman changed his policies towards Bosnia after diplomatic pressure from the United States and the UN Security Council. The Washington Agreement was signed in March 1994. The situation became very unfavourable to the future of Western Bosnia, as Fikret Abdić could no longer count on financial or military help by one of his protectors.

It was militarily defeated during Operation Tiger in June and August 1994, when the territory of Western Bosnia was seized by the Bosnian government troops. Fikret Abdić moved to Zagreb. However, they were expelled later that year with the significant help of the Serbs in Operation Spider, and the Autonomous Province of Western Bosnia was re-established.

The province declared itself the independent Republic of Western Bosnia on 26 July 1995.

In August 1995, Operation Storm made it serve as the last line of defense of the Republic of Serbian Krajina in Croatia. The Republic of Western Bosnia was wiped out completely during the joint Croatian-Bosnian government army action on 7 August 1995. Abdić was forced to flee to Croatia after the operation.

Aftermath 
Western Bosnia's territory was incorporated into the Federation of Bosnia and Herzegovina, within the present-day Una-Sana Canton. Fikret Abdić, who maintained friendly relations with Croatian President Franjo Tuđman, had acquired Croatian citizenship and lived in Croatia in exile.

After the death of Tuđman in December 1999 and the defeat of the Croatian Democratic Union in the Croatian elections of 2000, Abdić was eventually arrested and convicted for war crimes against civilian Bosniaks loyal to the Republic of Bosnia and Herzegovina. The trial took place in Croatia, where Abdić was condemned to 20 years in prison in 2002. On 9 March 2012, he was released after he had served two thirds of his reduced sentence. In 2016, the citizens of Velika Kladuša elected Abdić mayor.

See also 
 History of Bosnia and Herzegovina
 Bosnian Serb Republic
 Croatian Republic of Herzeg-Bosnia
 Republic of Serbian Krajina
 National Defence of the Autonomous Province of Western Bosnia

References

States and territories established in 1993
States and territories disestablished in 1995
Western Bosnia
Western Bosnia
Western Bosnia
Western Bosnia
1993 establishments in Europe
1995 disestablishments in Europe
Bosnian-speaking countries and territories
Former subdivisions of Bosnia and Herzegovina
History of Bosanska Krajina